Qabaq Tappeh (also Romanized as Qābāq Tappeh and Qabāq Tappeh) is a village in Owch Tappeh-ye Gharbi Rural District, Torkamanchay District, Meyaneh County, East Azerbaijan Province, Iran. 95 families made up its 509 residents in 2006, according to the census.

References 

Populated places in Meyaneh County